The Hamilton Fire Department provides fire protection, technical rescue services, hazardous materials response, and first responder emergency medical assistance to the city of Hamilton, Ontario.

History
The fire department in Hamilton dates back to 1879, when Alexander Aitchison was appointed Fire Chief of the city. Aitchison was responsible for radically reforming the department, and during his tenure, the department was changed into an entirely paid one, as well as introducing the first swinging harness and sliding pole in Canada.

Starting in 1990, Hamilton area firefighters have been instructed on how to operate heart defibrillators, as it often takes less time for firefighters to reach victims compared to ambulance paramedics. A study found that the policy change decreased the amount of time between a 911 call and when the patient received defibrillation by almost 30 percent.

In 1997, the department faced one of its worst crises: the Plastimet fire. The fire was located at a plastics-recycling facility, and began a warehouse containing bales of polyvinyl chloride plastics. Firefighters battled the conflagration for four days, and the plume of toxins and smoke released by the burning plastics may have caused the deaths of several Hamilton firefighters in the years after the fire. The Plastimet fire remains the largest plastics fire in Canadian history, and one of Canada's worst environmental disasters. 

In 2001, Hamilton amalgamated with the other municipalities of Hamilton-Wentworth Region to create an expanded City of Hamilton. As a result, the Hamilton Fire Department, which served the original city, was merged with the fire departments of Ancaster, Dundas, Flamborough, Glanbrook and Stoney Creek. The department went from 12 stations to 26, and became a composite department with both full-time and paid-on-call firefighters.

In 2010, the department changed to a 24-shift schedule. Previously, firefighters had worked 10-hour day shifts and 14-hour night shifts.

In 2011, the department hired Rob Simonds as its new chief, replacing the retiring Jim Kay.

In 2012, a firefighter was terminated after using racial slurs during an argument with a coworker. In 2015, an arbitrator determined that the firefighter had been terminated without just cause.  The firefighter was reinstated, and received a 10-day suspension in accordance with the arbitrator's findings. The other firefighter involved in the altercation received a 5-day suspension for his role in the incident.  The incident led to calls for greater diversity in the department.

In 2016, David Cunliffe was appointed Fire Chief, succeeding Robert Simonds. 

In 2019, a Hamilton firefighter suffered serious injuries after falling off the edge of the Niagara Escarpment while trying to rescue a group of lost hikers.

Fire stations and apparatus

Response Guidelines and Special Units

Urban Responses

Rural Responses

Special Units

See also 

 Hamilton Paramedic Service
 Hamilton Police Service
 City of Hamilton, Ontario
 Hamilton City Council
 Toronto Fire Services
 Mississauga Fire and Emergency Services
 Peel Regional Paramedic Services
 Ancaster, Ontario
 Dundas, Ontario
 Stoney Creek, Ontario
 Burlington, Ontario
 Volunteer Firefighter

References

Fire departments in Ontario
Municipal government of Hamilton, Ontario